Artyom Valeryevich Golubev (born 21 January 1999) is a Russian football player who plays as a defensive midfielder for FC Ufa.

Club career
He made his debut in the Russian Professional Football League for FC Krasnodar-2 on 16 May 2018 in a game against FC Afips Afipsky.

He made his Russian Premier League debut for FC Krasnodar on 2 December 2018 in a game against FC Ural Yekaterinburg as a 84th-minute substitute for Mauricio Pereyra.

On 31 July 2019, he joined FC Ufa on loan until 31 May 2021, with Krasnodar holding an option to terminate the loan early. On 23 July 2020, Ufa bought out his rights from Krasnodar.

Career statistics

References

External links
 
 
 

1999 births
Sportspeople from Volgograd
Living people
Russian footballers
Russia youth international footballers
Russia under-21 international footballers
Association football defenders
Association football midfielders
FC Krasnodar-2 players
FC Krasnodar players
FC Ufa players
Russian Premier League players
Russian First League players
Russian Second League players